The 2016 Billboard Music Awards ceremony was held on May 22, 2016, at the T-Mobile Arena in Las Vegas, Nevada, the first nationally televised event to originate from that venue. It aired live on ABC with hosts Ludacris and Ciara.

The nominees were announced on April 11, 2016, with The Weeknd earning the most nominations with twenty. Britney Spears received the Billboard Millennium Award for her  achievements and influence  in the music industry. Celine Dion received the Billboard Icon Award in recognition of her career spanning over three decades. Madonna made an appearance to pay tribute to Prince. Adele premiered the music video for her single "Send My Love (To Your New Lover)" at the ceremony.

Performances

Presenters
Source:

	
 Jessica Alba
 Ashton Kutcher
 Idina Menzel
 Kristen Bell
 Betty Cantrell
 DJ Khaled
 Kathryn Hahn
 Wiz Khalifa
 Laverne Cox
 Mila Kunis
 Keke Palmer
 Kelly Rowland
 Rebecca Romijn
 Serayah McNeill
 Seal
 Steven Tyler
 Lindsey Vonn
 Pete Wentz
 Priyanka Chopra
 Marc Cuban
 Halsey
 Zendaya
 Questlove
 Thomas Rhett
 JoJo Fletcher
 Heidi Klum
 Michael Strahan

Winners and nominees
Winners are listed first.

Artists with multiple wins and nominations

References

Billboard Music Award
Billboard Music Awards
Billboard Music Awards
Billboard
Billboard awards